A misadventure or accident is an unforeseen and unplanned event or circumstance with negative consequences.

Misadventure may also refer to:

 Misadventure, the formal term for medical error in surgery or other fields of medicine
 Death by misadventure, an inquest verdict
 Misadventures (Pierce the Veil album), 2016
 Misadventures (Such Gold album), 2012
 Misadventure, a 2010 noir novel by Millard Kaufman
 "Misadventure", an episode of the television series The Crown
 Ed, Edd n Eddy: The Mis-Edventures, a 2005 video game